Frederick Lee Cobourn (October 12, 1885 – June 23, 1962) was an American politician and judge from Maryland. He served as a member of the Maryland House of Delegates, representing Harford County, from 1918 to 1920 and from 1927 to 1930.

Early life
Frederick Lee Cobourn was born on October 12, 1885, in Havre de Grace, Maryland, to Lydia (née Cox) and Hiram C. Cobourn. At the age of 12, his father died and Cobourn left school to work. Cobourn studied with a local minister to be eligible for college. Cobourn graduated from the University of Maryland School of Law in 1913. He was then admitted to the bar.

Career
Following his admission to the bar, Cobourn opened law offices in Havre de Grace and Bel Air.

Cobourn was a Democrat. He served as a member of the Maryland House of Delegates, representing Harford County, from 1918 to 1920 and from 1927 to 1930. In 1921, Cobourn was defeated by Millard Tydings for the Democratic nomination for the Maryland Senate. He retired from politics in 1953.

Cobourn was a judge of the Third Judicial Circuit Court, which included Harford and Baltimore counties, from November 1938 to November 1953.

Personal life
Cobourn married Florence H. He had a son and daughter, G. Howlett and Mrs. Alfred Walgren. Cobourn lived at 115 South Union Avenue in Havre de Grace.

Cobourn died on June 23, 1962, at Harford Memorial Hospital in Havre de Grace. He was buried at Angel Hill Cemetery in Havre de Grace.

References

1885 births
1962 deaths
People from Havre de Grace, Maryland
University of Maryland Francis King Carey School of Law alumni
Democratic Party members of the Maryland House of Delegates
Maryland lawyers